Baran Çelik (born  29 September 2003), better known as VC Barre, is a Swedish rapper of Turkish/Kurdish origin He is best known for his collaborations with fellow rapper Adaam; the two grew up in the same neighborhood Valsta, Märsta, and co-founded the record label and hip hop collective Grind Gang Music along with D50.

Discography

Albums

Singles

Featured singles

Other charting songs

Notes

References 

21st-century Swedish male musicians
2003 births
Living people
People from Sigtuna Municipality
Swedish rappers